Gultosh used to be an all-Jewish village located near the city of Gondar, in Ethiopia. Gultosh location is about 10 kilometers East from Gondar City center, across the Angereb river and Megech River. Gultush topography is mountainous in a way that limits vehicle access. The village used to have approximately 90 households by the end of 1970s.
The original inhabitants left for Israel in the 1980s, the last of which stayed until 1986. Gultosh has been repopulated by locals from nearby villages.

The village was situated in a valley between mountains and relied on small-scale agriculture, with tef, wheat and barley being among the main crops.

The Israeli rapper Jeremy Cool Habash was born in Gultosh.

Notes

 
Historic Jewish communities in Ethiopia
Populated places in the Amhara Region